Bəyimsarov (also, Begimsarov, Beyimsarov, and Sarov) is a village and municipality in the Tartar Rayon of Azerbaijan.  It has a population of 2,591.

References 

Populated places in Tartar District